Mathieu Bordaraud (born 27 May 1990), better known by his stage name Mathieu Koss, is French DJ, record producer and composer from Nancy.

In 2017, his cover of "Big Jet Plane" by Angus and Julia Stone with the Brazilian DJ Alok peaked at number one in Brazil and in the top 10 in multiple European countries. In 2020 his collaboration with the Belgian DJ Lost Frequencies "Don't Leave Me Now" receive a Platinum record in Belgium.

Biography 
Mathieu was signed in 2016 to Spinnin' Records. His first single "Need Your Lovin", a cover from The Korgis, was released in the summer of 2016. In the same year, Bob Sinclar requested him to remix his song "Someone Who Needs Me". Koss's collaboration with Alok, "Big Jet Plane", peaked at 19th on the Belgian Wallonia Tip chart. A music video for the song was released. The single gained more than 200 million streams on Spotify, Apple Music and YouTube. "Big Jet Plane" was nominated in 2018 for Clip of the Year in the  MTV Millennial Awards (MTV MIAW). In 2018, he released his first solo single with French singer Joan Alasta titled "Best Is Yet To Come". The single gained more than 5 million streams on Spotify.

March 2019 Mathieu release Never Growing Up with the American singer Aloe Blacc. The single will stay 45 weeks in the Airplay charts in Belgium.

In 2020 he release "HOME" a collaboration with the Bob Marley's son Ziggy Marley. The same year Mathieu receive a Platinum Record for "Don't Leave Me Now" his collaboration with the Belgian DJ Lost Frequencies.

Discography

Charted singles 

*Did not appear in the official Belgian Ultratop 50 charts, but rather in the bubbling under Ultratip charts.

Other singles

Remixes 
 Bob Sinclar — "Someone Who Needs Me" [Yellow Productions/Spinnin' Remixes] (2016)
 Niels Geusebroek — "Wildfire" (Mathieu Koss Remix) [Spinnin' Prenium] (2016)
 Cazzette — "Static" (Mathieu Koss Remix) [Icon/PRMD] (2016)
 Destiny's Child — "Say My Name" (Mathieu Koss Remix) [Free/Ultra] (2016)
 Kygo featuring Ellie Goulding — "First Time" (Mathieu Koss Remix) [Free/Columbia] (2017)
 Klingande featuring Krishane — "Rebell Yell" (Mathieu Koss Remix) [Ultra] (2018)
 Celestal featuring Rachel Pearl and Grynn — "Old School Romance" (Mathieu Koss Remix) [MCA/Casablanca/Universal Music Group] (2018)
 Noa Kirel — "Please Don't Suck" (Mathieu Koss Remix) [Atlantic Records] (2021)
 Graham Candy — "Find My Way" (Mathieu Koss Edit) [V2 Records] (2022)

Awards and nominations

Certifications

References

External links
 Official website
 AllMusic profile

1990 births
French DJs
French electronic musicians
French record producers
Living people
Musicians from Nancy, France
Spinnin' Records artists
Electronic dance music DJs